The 2019 Nigerian Senate election in Cross River State held on February 23, 2019, to elect members of the Nigerian Senate to represent Cross River State. Onor Sandy Ojang  representing Cross River Central, Oko Rose Okoji representing Cross River North and Bassey Gershom Henry representing Cross River South all won on the platform of Peoples Democratic Party.

Overview

Summary

Results

Cross River Central 
A total of 11 candidates registered with the Independent National Electoral Commission to contest in the election. PDP Sandy Ojang Onor candidate  won the election, defeating APC candidate Ndoma-Egba and 9 other party candidates. Sandy received 56.63% of the votes, while Ndoma-Egba received 42.61%.

Cross River North 
A total of 12 candidates registered with the Independent National Electoral Commission to contest in the election. PDP candidate Rose Oko won the election, defeating APC candidate Wabily Nyiam and 10 other party candidates. Rose received 73.32% of the votes, while Nyiam received 26.23%.

Cross River South 
A total of 11 candidates registered with the Independent National Electoral Commission to contest in the election. PDP candidate Bassey Gershom Henry won the election, defeating APC  candidate Prince Otu and 9 other party candidates. Bassey received 54.51% of the votes, while Otu received 44.50%.

2020 Bye election 
A bye election was held on 5 December 2020 in the Cross River North Senatorial District due to a vacancy following the demise of Rose Oko. Steven Odey of PDP contested against Joe Agi of Apc. They totalled 129,207 and 19,165 votes respectively. Odey was declared the winner by INEC.

References 

Cross River State
Senate
Cross River State Senate elections